Sam Greene is a British academic; professor in Russian politics and director of the Russia Institute at King's College London.

Greene earned a PhD in political sociology from the London School of Economics.

Publications
Moscow in Movement: Power and Opposition in Putin's Russia (Stanford University Press, 2014)
Putin v. the People: The Perilous Politics of a Divided Russia (Yale University Press, with Graeme Robertson, 2019)

References

Alumni of the London School of Economics
Academics of King's College London

Living people
Year of birth missing (living people)